This One's for You is the debut studio album by American country music singer Luke Combs. It was released on June 2, 2017, through Columbia Nashville. It was No. 1 on the Top Country Albums chart for 50 weeks, a record for a male artist on this chart. The album includes the singles "Hurricane", "When It Rains It Pours", and "One Number Away". A deluxe reissue titled This One's for You Too was released June 1, 2018, and featured five new tracks to commemorate the album's first anniversary. Two of these tracks, "She Got the Best of Me" and "Beautiful Crazy", were also issued as singles.

History
The album's lead single was "Hurricane", which reached No. 1 on Country Airplay. Combs co-wrote all twelve songs on the album. He told Nash Country Daily that he considered it "a good synopsis of who I am" and "I don't think there’s one track that sounds the same as another."

Critical reception
Stephen Thomas Erlewine of AllMusic rated the album 3.5 out of 5 stars, praising the ballads and noting that "The tension between Combs' traditional side and modern inclinations is what gives This One's for You some freshness and it surfaces often." Chuck Dauphin of Sounds Like Nashville wrote that "vocals are one thing that Combs has in his favor. You get the feeling that no producer had to coach him to be country", while also praising Combs's songwriting.

Commercial performance
This One's for You debuted at number five on the US Billboard 200 on its release in June 2017, selling 43,000 album-equivalent units of which 35,000 copies were pure album sales in its first week. It also debuted at number one on the US Top Country Albums chart. In its second week, the album dropped to number 33 selling an additional 8,700 units. In June 2018, the deluxe version of the LP was released, and it had its biggest sales week and returned to number one on Top Country Albums with 55,000 equivalent album units (23,000 in traditional album sales) consumed. In August 2019, it became the longest reigning album on the Top Country Albums in the chart history for a male artist at 46 weeks. By the chart dated November 2, 2019, the album had spent 50 weeks at No. 1 on Top Country Albums, equaling the record of Shania Twain's Come On Over.

On March 8, 2019, the album was certified double platinum by the Recording Industry Association of America (RIAA) for combined sales and album-equivalent units of over two million units.  The album has sold 573,900 copies in the United States as of March 2020, with 2,694,000 units consumed in total.

Upon release of This One's for You Too, the album reached a new peak of number four on the Billboard 200 in June 2018.

Track listing

Personnel
Adapted from liner notes.

Musicians
 Luke Combs – lead vocals (1–12)
 Jon Conley – electric guitar (1, 2, 4, 5, 7, 9)
 Howard Duck – organ (1, 2, 4, 5, 9), piano (2, 4, 5, 9), synthesizer (5, 9)
 Dave Francis – bass guitar (1–5, 7–12)
 Wil Houchens – piano (3, 12), organ (7, 8, 10, 12)
 Tyler King – background vocals (6)
 Brent Mason – electric guitar (10), acoustic guitar (11)
 Justin Meeks – drums (10, 11), percussion (11)
 Sammy Mitchell – electric guitar (6), acoustic guitar (6), bass guitar (6), background vocals (6)
 James McNair – background vocals (2)
 Scott Moffatt – synthesizer (1, 7, 8), programming (1–5, 7–12), electric guitar (2, 3, 4, 8–12), acoustic guitar (3, 8, 10), percussion (10, 12), bass guitar (10), background vocals (1–5, 7–12)
 Gary Morse – pedal steel guitar (3, 7, 8, 10, 11, 12), lap steel guitar (7, 8), banjo (7, 10, 11)
 Kurt Ozan – Dobro (2, 9), pedal steel guitar (6, 9)
 Rob Pennington – background vocals (2)
 Sol Philcox-Littlefield – electric guitar (3, 6, 7, 8, 10, 12)
 Brian Pruitt – drums (1, 2, 4, 5, 9), percussion (5), programming (5)
 Jerry Roe – drums (3, 7, 8, 12)
 Grady Saxman – drums (6), percussion (6)
 Bobby Terry – acoustic guitar (1, 2, 4, 5, 7, 9)
 Grace Anne Waller – background vocals (6)
 Rob Williford – acoustic guitar (6), background vocals (6)

Technical
 Jim Cooley – mixing (except 4, 9, 11, 12)
 Ben Cowherd – mixing (9)
 Alex Gilson – engineering
 Gold Cassette – studio 
 Erik Hellerman – mixing (4, 11)
 The Jackie Boyz – producer (6)
 Andrew Mendelson – mastering
 Sammy Mitchell – producer (6)
 Scott Moffatt – producer, mixing (12)
 Kenny Royster – engineering

This One's for You Too credits
Credits for This One's for You Too tracks (13–17) adapted from liner notes.

Musicians
 Dave Cohen – keyboards (13, 17)
 Luke Combs – lead vocals (13–17)
 Jon Conley – acoustic guitar (13), electric guitar (13, 17)
 Dave Francis – bass guitar (16)
 Doug Fraser – drums (13), percussion (13)
 Aubrey Haynie – fiddle (13, 15)
 Wil Houchens – keyboards (14, 15), piano (16), organ (16)
 Ben Jordan – bass guitar (13)
 Tim Marks – bass guitar (17)
 Brent Mason – electric guitar (16)
 Justin Meeks – drums (16)
 Carl Miner – acoustic guitar (14, 15)
 Scott Moffatt – background vocals (13–17), electric guitar (13–17), acoustic guitar (17), programming (13, 17), percussion (13, 14, 16), synthesizer (16)
 Gary Morse – pedal steel guitar (13–17)
 Sol Philcox-Littlefield – electric guitar (14, 15)
 Jerry Roe – drums (14, 15, 17), percussion (15, 17)
 Jimmie Lee Sloas – bass guitar (14, 15)
 Ilya Toshinsky – acoustic guitar (17), mandolin (17), banjo (17)

Technical
 Chris Lord-Alge – mixing (13)
 Jim Cooley – mixing (14, 16, 17)
 Alex Gilson – engineering
 Andrew Mendelson – mastering
 Scott Moffatt – producer (13–17), mixing (15)

Charts

Weekly charts

This One's for You Too

Year-end charts

Decade-end charts

Certifications

References

2017 debut albums
Columbia Records albums
Luke Combs albums